Ernest Spears (born November 6, 1967) is a former American football defensive back. He played for the New Orleans Saints in 1990.

References

1967 births
Living people
American football defensive backs
USC Trojans football players
New Orleans Saints players